Georg Misch (5 April 1878, in Berlin – 10 June 1965, in Göttingen) was a German philosopher.

Life
Of Jewish descent, Misch was the pupil and son-in-law of Wilhelm Dilthey. Misch attempted to further develop Dilthey's life-philosophical hermeneutics, in particular in relation to the study of logic, comparative philosophy and autobiography. Misch edited  a number of volumes of Dilthey's works.
Misch concluded his studies with Dilthey in Berlin in 1900 with a dissertation on Die philosophische Begründung des Positivismus in den Schriften von D’Alembert und Turgot. He worked as a professor in Marburg and Göttingen before retiring under pressure from the National Socialist government in 1935. He went into exile to the UK, living there from 1939 until 1946. Misch returned to Göttingen in 1946 and continued to work there until his death in 1965.

His students include Otto Friedrich Bollnow and Josef König.

Work
Georg Misch wrote one of the first extended critical appropriations of Edmund Husserl and Martin Heidegger, which evaluated phenomenology from the perspective of Dilthey's philosophy, in Lebensphilosophie und Phänomenologie. Eine Auseinandersetzung der Diltheyschen Richtung mit Heidegger und Husserl, Leipzig 1930 (3. Aufl. Stuttgart 1964). Misch's Der Weg in die Philosophie (1926) is  a pioneering work in comparative philosophy. He developed a hermeneutic logic that was later published as Der Aufbau der Logik auf dem Boden der Philosophie des Lebens. He is mostly known for his monumental Geschichte der Autobiographie (History of Autobiography), in several volumes, beginning in 1907. The last volume was published posthumously in 1969.

Selected works
 Geschichte der Autobiographie, zwei Bände, Leipzig/Berlin 1907 (Bd. I, 3. Aufl. 1969; Bd. II, 2. Aufl. 1955). Translated in English as A History of Autobiography in Antiquity (Part 1), London 2003.
 Der Weg in die Philosophie, Leipzig 1926 (2. Aufl. 1950). Translated in English as The Dawn of Philosophy: A Philosophical Primer, Cambridge, MA 1951.
 Lebensphilosophie und Phänomenologie. Eine Auseinandersetzung der Diltheyschen Richtung mit Heidegger und Husserl, Leipzig 1930 (3. Aufl. Stuttgart 1964)
 Der Aufbau der Logik auf dem Boden der Philosophie des Lebens, Freiburg 2002.

References

External links
 
 Otto Friedrich Bollnow, "Lebensphilosophie und Logik: Georg Misch und der Göttinger Kreis"
 Jean Grondin, "Georg Misch und die Universalität der Hermeneutik: Logik oder Rhetorik?"
 Friedrich Kümmel, "Zum Verhältnis von Logik, Metaphysik und geschichtlicher Weltansicht bei Georg Misch"
Massimo Mezzanzanica, Georg Misch. Dalla filosofia della vita alla logica ermeneutica https://www.francoangeli.it/Ricerca/scheda_libro.aspx?Id=9454
 Eric S. Nelson, "Heidegger, Misch, and the Origins of Philosophy"
 Nelson, Eric S. (2017). Chinese and Buddhist Philosophy in Early Twentieth-Century German Thought London: Bloomsbury. .

1878 births
1965 deaths
20th-century German philosophers
Jewish emigrants from Nazi Germany to the United Kingdom
Jewish philosophers
Hermeneutists
German male writers